Hyledius regalis, is a species of weevil found in Sri Lanka. 

It is a small reddish color beetle and the host plant is Myristica dactyloides.

References 

Curculionidae
Insects of Sri Lanka
Beetles described in 1988